Issouf Compaoré (born 12 April 1988) is a Burkinabé international football defender.

Formed at l’Ecole de Formation Yeo Martial (EFYM) in Côte d'Ivoire he played with Ivorian ASC Ouragahio. He had trials with Olympique de Marseille and short spells with R.E. Virton and FC Metz before moving to Serbia in 2008 where after playing initially one season with lower leagues club FK Fruškogorac he signed with FK Banat Zrenjanin.

He preferably plays as left-back although he can also play as left-winger.

Despite being born in Côte d'Ivoire (Ivory Coast) and having made part of the Côte d'Ivoire cadetes national team, he has chousen to represent Burkina Faso national team since 2008.

References

External links
 Profile at Srbijafudbal

1988 births
Living people
Citizens of Burkina Faso through descent
Burkinabé footballers
Burkina Faso international footballers
Association football defenders
FK Banat Zrenjanin players
Serbian First League players
Expatriate footballers in Serbia
People from Comoé District
Ivorian footballers
Ivorian people of Burkinabé descent
Sportspeople of Burkinabé descent
21st-century Burkinabé people